François Braud (born 27 July 1986 in Pontarlier, Doubs) is a retired French nordic combined skier and non-commissioned officer.

Career
Competing in two Winter Olympics, he earned his best finish of fourth in the 4 x 5 km team event at Vancouver in 2010 while earning his best finish of 14th in the 10 km individual large hill event at those same games.

Braud's best finish at the FIS Nordic World Ski Championships was fourth in the 4 x 5 km team event at Liberec in 2009 while his best individual finish was tenth in the 10 km mass start at those same championships.

He has two individual career victories at various levels in the 15 km individual (2004, 2006). Braud's best World cup finish was fifth twice in a team 4 x 5 km event (2007, 2009) while his best individual finish was sixth three times, all in 2009.

References

External links

1986 births
French male Nordic combined skiers
Living people
Nordic combined skiers at the 2006 Winter Olympics
Nordic combined skiers at the 2010 Winter Olympics
Nordic combined skiers at the 2014 Winter Olympics
Nordic combined skiers at the 2018 Winter Olympics
Olympic Nordic combined skiers of France
People from Pontarlier
Université Savoie-Mont Blanc alumni
FIS Nordic World Ski Championships medalists in Nordic combined
Sportspeople from Doubs